Redox Brands was a marketing company formed in 2000 by Todd Wichmann and Richard Owen, former executives with the multinational consumer products firm Procter & Gamble (P&G). The company's first product was Oxydol brand purchased from P&G. P&G would continue manufacturing Oxydol and provide back office support.  Redox had won out over private label companies in the purchase of Oxydol.  Biz was purchased in an auction from P&G in the Summer of 2000.  Forbes estimated that Oxydol was sold for $7 million and Biz for greater than $40 million.  In one year, Oxydol sales were 800% greater than when acquired.

In March 2001, Allied Capital made its first investment in Redox and made an additional investment in August 2002.   In 2002, Wichmann left Redox for another startup, HealthPro Brands.

Allied Capital acquired ChemPro, Inc. in March 2006.  Allied then merged Redox and ChemPro, Inc., with the resulting company being renamed CR Brands.

Brands
 Biz
 Oxydol

See also
 ChemPro, Inc.
 CR Brands
 HealthPro Brands
 Prestige Brands, also owns former P&G brands

External links
 Official website

References

Former Procter & Gamble brands
Companies based in Ohio